The Akaoa by-election was a by-election in the Cook Islands seat of Akaoa.  It took place on 29 November 2006, and was precipitated by the seat being a dead tie in the 2006 general election.  After a judicial recount, the High Court ordered a by-election.

Both general election candidates contested the by-election.  The poll was won by the Cook Islands Party's Teariki Heather.  The by-election attracted a higher number of votes than the general election, in part because of a slight increase in enrolments.

References

By-elections in the Cook Islands
2006 elections in Oceania
2006 in the Cook Islands
Rarotonga